Daru-Al-Moameneen (also known by its acronym; DALMO) Arabic:  دار المؤمنين) is an Islamic organisation, founded in 2005 in Bradley Stoke, South Gloucestershire, representing the Muslims of the South West of England, UK.  It is located at Grovelands House, Woodlands, Bradley Stoke, Bristol BS32 4JT


Charity and courses

Daru-Al-Moameneen has had Arabic language courses for adults and Quranic recitation classes for children since February 26, 2006. DALMO is the regional Arabic language centre, administered by Muslim Association of Britain.

Daily events
DALMO provides the facilities for daily salat (prayer) at their new premises in Bradley Stoke, Bristol, attracting area Muslims. DALMO also provides the opportunity for all its members to engage in sports activities every Saturday at the Bradley Stoke Community School.

Sports activities include:
 Badminton
 Football
 Basketball
 Table-tennis

Religious rulings
DALMO's management committee uses the European Council for Fatwa and Research as its authority on sharia law. Therefore, DALMO bases its religious rulings, such as the ending of Ramadan (and hence the beginning of Eid-ul-Fitr) on the European group's decisions. This includes the combining of prayers etc.

References

External links
DALMO's Official website
DALMO's google group

Islamic organisations based in the United Kingdom
Islamist groups